Every Step of the Way is a 1988 album by American pianist David Benoit.

Every Step of the Way  may also refer to:

 "Every Step of the Way", a song by Robert Allen and Al Stillman release as a single by Johnny Mathis in 1963 and appearing on I'll Search My Heart and Other Great Hits (1964)
 A cover by Dickie Rock and The Miami Showband reach #1 on Irish charts in 1965
 "Every Step of the Way", a John Waite song from his album Mask of Smiles (1985)
 "Every Step of the Way", The Monkees song from their album Pool It! (1987)
 "Every Step of the Way", a Santana song from their album Caravanserai (1972)
 "Every Step of the Way", a McBride & the Ride song from their album Burnin' Up the Road (1990)
 "Every Step of the Way", a Steve Walsh song from his album Schemer-Dreamer (1980)
 "Every Step of the Way", an Ian Hunter song from his album All of the Good Ones Are Taken (1983)
 "Every Step of the Way", a Ferlin Husky song from his album Your Love Is Heavenly Sunshine (1969)
 Every Step of the Way, an album by Peppino D'Agostino (2002)